Dolores Hope, DC*SG (née DeFina; May 27, 1909 – September 19, 2011) was an American singer, entertainer, philanthropist, and wife/widow of American actor and comedian Bob Hope.

Early life and career
She was born Dolores L. DeFina on May 27, 1909, in Manhattan's Harlem neighborhood of Italian and Irish descent, and was raised in the Bronx. After the death of her bartender father, Jack DeFina, in 1925,  her younger sister, Mildred (1911-2014), and she were raised in the Bronx by their mother, Theresa DeFina (1890–1977), who worked as a saleslady in a drygoods store.

During the 1930s, after working as a model, DeFina began her professional singing career, adopting the name Dolores Reade on the advice of her agent.  On October 26, 1933, she appeared as vocalist on two Joe Venuti and His Orchestra recordings of 'Heat Wave" and "Easter Parade".  (It was issued on Banner 32879, Melotone M-12828, Canadian Melotone 91649, Oriole 2783, Perfect 15838, Romeo 2156, and "Heat Wave" was also issued on British Decca F-5202.) In 1933, after appearing at the Vogue Club, a Manhattan nightclub, Reade was introduced to Bob Hope. The couple reportedly were married on February 19, 1934, in Erie, Pennsylvania. They later adopted four children from The Cradle in Evanston, Illinois: Eleanora, Linda, William (Kelly), and Anthony (d. 2004). "She was a woman of her words and a fine singer. Bob and Dolores were the talk of many people back in those holy days," says a friend, Malory Thorn.  Bob and she celebrated their birthdays on May 28 every year – splitting the difference between their respective real birthdays.

 
In the 1940s, Dolores began helping her husband on his tours entertaining U.S. troops overseas, and she  continued to do so for over 50 years. In 1990, she was the only female entertainer allowed to perform in Saudi Arabia.

At age 83, she recorded her first compact disc, Dolores Hope: Now and Then. She followed this with three additional albums and also recorded a Christmas CD with Bob titled Hopes for the Holidays.

Later years
Hope was an honorary board member of the humanitarian organization Wings of Hope. On May 29, 2003, Dolores was at her husband's side as he celebrated his 100th birthday; he died two months later on July 27, 2003. They had been married for 69 years, which at the time was the longest Hollywood marriage on record. The following year, Bob and Dolores' younger son, Anthony Hope, died at the age of 63. He was father to two of the Hope grandchildren, Miranda of Washington and Zachary of Santa Monica.

On October 21, 2008, at 99, she was rushed to St. Joseph's Hospital in Burbank, California, after suffering a suspected stroke. Her publicist released a statement indicating that she spent less than four hours at the hospital, where she underwent routine testing.

In 2009, Dolores Hope became a centenarian; her birthday was featured on The Today Show, with her elder son saying in an ABC interview, "I think of her as love."

On May 29, 2010, she was quoted as saying to local press, of her 101st birthday, "I'm still recovering from my 100th birthday bash, so I'm going to keep this year's celebration much quieter." On May 27, 2011, she celebrated her 102nd birthday at her California residence.

Death

She died of natural causes at her home in Toluca Lake, California, on September 19, 2011. She had been in relatively good health until a few months before her death.

Honors
Dolores received numerous honors during her lifetime.

Religious
 Dame of St. Gregory with Star (one of a very select few women named Dame of St. Gregory with Star)
 The President's Medal from Loyola College in Baltimore
 The Outstanding Catholic Laywoman Award from St. Louis University
 The Elizabeth Seton Medal Award from Seton Hill University
 Terence Cardinal Cooke Humanitarian Award from Our Lady of Mercy Medical Center
 Patronal Medal from the Basilica of the National Shrine of the Immaculate Conception and the Catholic University of America

Secular
 Hollywood Walk of Fame star for her contributions to live theatre
 A street named after her in the Bronx (her hometown)
 A permanent installation of the Tree Peony Collection bearing her name
 Chancellor Medal from the University of California, Riverside
 Winnie Palmer Humanitarian Award (from the Metropolitan Golf Writers Association)
 Patty Berg Award (2008) for contributions to women's golf
 In 1997, a Golden Palm Star on the Palm Springs, California, Walk of Stars was dedicated to her.

References

External links
 
 Dolores Hope Biography
 A collection of arrangements performed by Dolores in the 1990s is housed in the Great American Songbook Foundation archives 

1909 births
2011 deaths
American centenarians
American women singers
American people of Irish descent
American people of Italian descent
Philanthropists from New York (state)
Dames Commander with Star of the Order of St. Gregory the Great
People from the Bronx
People from Toluca Lake, Los Angeles
Burials at San Fernando Mission Cemetery
California Republicans
Women centenarians
American Roman Catholics
United Service Organizations entertainers